Millardet is a French surname. Notable people with the surname include:

Patricia Millardet (1957–2020), French actress
Pierre-Marie-Alexis Millardet (1838–1902), French botanist and mycologist

French-language surnames